Masayuki Koga (born in Omuta City, Japan) is a shakuhachi player and former member of the Ensemble Nipponia. He studied Kinko shakuhachi with Kiichi Koga, his father, and Tozan Ryu shakuhachi with Kazan Saka, and teaches both schools. His students include Richard Marriott.

He is the general director of the Japanese Music Institute of America, located in San Francisco and Berkeley, which he founded in 1981. Since 1995, the Institute has taught shakuhachi, koto, and taiko.

References

External links
"Japanese Music Institute of America", Shakuhachi.com
"Masayuki Koga", Discogs
"Shakuhachi History in the U.S.A.", JMIA.org.

Shakuhachi players
Living people
People from Ōmuta, Fukuoka
Japanese emigrants to the United States
American musicians of Japanese descent
Musicians from the San Francisco Bay Area
Year of birth missing (living people)